Hellbound or Hell Bound may refer to:

Film and television
 Hell Bound (1931 film), an American film directed by Walter Lang
 Hell Bound (1957 film), an American film directed by William J. Hole Jr. 
 Hellbound: Hellraiser II, a 1988 film in the Hellraiser franchise
 Hellbound (film), a 1994 film starring Chuck Norris
 Hellbound?, a 2012 Canadian documentary film
 Hellbound (TV series), a 2021 South Korean television series
 "Hell Bound" (Angel), a television episode
 "Hellbound" (The X-Files), a television episode

Music

Albums
 Hellbound (Iron Angel album) or the title song, 2018
 Hellbound (Nekromantix album) or the title song, 1989
 Hellbound (Torture Squad album) or the title song, 2008
 Hellbound (Warlock album) or the title song, 1985
 Hellbound (EP) or the title song by the Living End, 1995
 One (Hellbound), by Demiricous, 2006
 Hellbound, by Fit for an Autopsy, 2013

Songs
 "Hellbound" (song), by Eminem, J-Black, and Masta Ace, 2000
 "Hellbound", by the Almighty RSO from Revenge of da Badd Boyz, 1994
 "Hellbound", by the Breeders from Pod, 1990
 "Hellbound", by Converge from No Heroes, 2006
 "Hellbound", by Hopes Die Last from Wolfpack, 2013
 "Hellbound", by Jerry Cantrell from Degradation Trip Volumes 1 & 2, 2002
 "Hellbound", by Pantera from Reinventing the Steel, 2000
 "Hellbound", by Tygers of Pan Tang from Spellbound, 1981
 "Chapter X: Hellbound", by Ceremonial Oath from The Book of Truth, 1993

Other uses
 Hellbound: The Blood War, an accessory for the 2nd edition of Advanced Dungeons & Dragons
 Hell Bound, a book by Francesca Gavin about New Gothic art